Carl Breitbach (1833–1904) was a German painter.

Biography
He was born in Berlin, and was a pupil of the Prussian Academy of Arts in that city, and of Thomas Couture in Paris. He settled in Berlin, where he devoted himself to landscape, genre, and portrait painting.

Works
The following are among his principal works:

 "Mill of Saint-Ouen, near Paris"
 "Park of Trianon"
 "Autumn Evening in the Weser Valley"
 "Sunrise in the Bavarian Highlands"
 "Kirmess-Joy"
 "Kirmess-Woe"
 "At the Fortune Teller's"
 "In the Village Tavern"
He did portraits of Intendant General von Hülsen, the painter Theodor Weber, the writer Theodor Fontane and others.

See also
 List of German painters

Notes

References

 

1833 births
1904 deaths
19th-century German painters
German male painters
20th-century German painters
20th-century German male artists
Artists from Berlin
Prussian Academy of Arts alumni
19th-century German male artists